Denny Island Aerodrome, previously Bella Bella (Denny Island) Airport , is located  east of Bella Bella, British Columbia, on Denny Island.

This airport has no services or fuel, but the fuel dock at nearby Shearwater is accessible to floatplanes and helicopters. The runway is limited to day/VFR operations only.

Airlines and destinations

See also
Bella Bella (Campbell Island) Airport
Bella Bella/Shearwater Water Aerodrome
Bella Bella/Waglisla Water Aerodrome

References

External links

 Bella Bella (Denny Island) Airport on COPA's Places to Fly airport directory

Registered aerodromes in British Columbia
Central Coast Regional District